Christopher Hinton Jr. (born September 14, 2000) is an American football nose tackle for the Los Angeles Chargers of the National Football League (NFL). He played college football at Michigan.

High school career 
Hinton attended Greater Atlanta Christian School. He played in the 2019 U.S. Army All-American Bowl. A five-star recruit, Hinton committed to play for the University of Michigan over offers from Ohio State, Georgia, Clemson, Stanford, and others.

College career 
Hinton played at Michigan from 2019 to 2021. As a true freshman in 2019, Hinton appeared in 12 games, starting one and had nine tackles on the season. In 2020, he played in 6 games making four starts with 13 tackles and his first career sack. During his junior season in 2021, Hinton started all 14 games on the defensive line. He racked up 33 tackles with two for loss and one sack. He also forced one fumble and had two fumble recoveries while earning honorable mention All-Big Ten honors.

After his junior season, Hinton declared for the 2022 NFL Draft.

Professional career

New York Giants
Hinton went undrafted in the 2022 NFL Draft, then was signed as an undrafted free agent by the New York Giants.  After spending training camp with the team, the Giants waived Hinton on August 19.

Miami Dolphins
Hinton was then signed to the practice squad of the Miami Dolphins on September 5. He was released two weeks later on September 19.

Atlanta Falcons
The Atlanta Falcons signed Hinton to the practice squad on October 7, releasing him three days later on October 10.

Los Angeles Chargers
Hinton was then picked up by the Los Angeles Chargers on November 9. He made his NFL debut on December 11, 2022, against the Miami Dolphins.

Personal life
Hinton is the son of former All-Pro offensive lineman Chris Hinton. He has a younger brother named Myles who began his college career at Stanford and later transferred to Michigan.

References

External links
Los Angeles Chargers bio
Michigan Wolverines bio

2000 births
Living people
Players of American football from Georgia (U.S. state)
American football defensive tackles
Michigan Wolverines football players
Los Angeles Chargers players